Flowability, also known as powder flow is a property that defines an ability of a powdered material to flow, related to cohesion.

Powder flowability depends on many traits:
 the shape and size of the powder particles due to intermolecular force,
 porosity
 electrostatic activity
 hygroscopy
 bulk density
 angle of repose
 presence of glidants
 oxidation rate (of a metallic powder)
 humidity

ISO 4490:2018 norm (and its precedent, ISO 4490:2014) standardizes a method for determining the flow rate of metallic powders. It uses a normalized/calibrated funnel, named Hall flowmeter.

See also 
 Fluid mechanics
 Soil mechanics
 Cohesion (geology)
 angle of repose

References 

Condensed matter physics
Intermolecular forces
Physical phenomena
Mechanics
Geotechnical engineering
Fluid mechanics